Les Égouts du paradis (The Sewers of Paradise) is a 1979 French film directed by José Giovanni, based on a 1976 heist by Albert Spaggiari.

Cast and roles
 Francis Huster as Albert Spaggiari
 Jean-François Balmer as 68
 Lila Kedrova as Charlotte
 Bérangère Bonvoisin as Mireille
 Gabriel Briand as Mike la Baraka
 Clément Harari as L'Égyptien
 Michel Subor as Biki le Targuy
 Mustapha Dali as Nazareth
 Jean Franval as Old Joseph
 Michel Peyrelon as Pierre
 André Pousse as the Bald Man
 Jacques Richard as Golden Mouth
 Serge Valletti as the Dancer

See also
The Great Riviera Bank Robbery (1979)
The Easy Way (2008)

External links
 

1979 films
Biographical films about French gangsters
French heist films
Films directed by José Giovanni
French crime films
1979 crime films
Crime films based on actual events
Films with screenplays by Michel Audiard
Films with screenplays by José Giovanni
1970s heist films
Films set in Nice
1970s French-language films
1970s French films